Alan Gurr (born 3 February 1982) is an Australian retired V8 Supercars driver. Gurr was a young karting star both on a national and international level who graduated through the Junior ranks to V8 Supercars with immediate results winning on debut in the V8 Development series. He was the teammate of Jason Bright at Britek Motorsport in 2007. He has also driven for Team Sirromet Wines in the 2006 V8 Supercar Championship Series as well as Holden Young Lions in 2004.

In the 2007 Endurance Races, He was partnered with Warren Luff in car 26. After the 2007 season Gurr retired with recurring injuries from a serious accident earlier in his career. He was replaced by Marcus Marshall in the #26 Irwin backed Ford, and he has since not raced in the series.

Career results

Complete Bathurst 1000 results

References

 2006 V8 Supercars Australia Yearbook 

1982 births
Australian Formula 3 Championship drivers
Formula Holden drivers
Living people
Racing drivers from Sydney
Supercars Championship drivers